Sheikha Moza bint Nasser Al-Missned (born 8 August 1959) is one of the three consorts of Sheikh Hamad bin Khalifa Al Thani, the former Emir of the State of Qatar. She is a co-founder and chairperson of the Qatar Foundation.

Early life and education
Moza is the daughter of Nasser bin Abdullah Al-Missned, a well-known opposition activist and the former head of the Al Muhannada confederation of Bani Hajer. After being released from prison due to his political activities and as an act of defiance against the policies of the deposed former Emir Ahmad bin Ali Al Thani, Nasser bin Abdullah led the entire Al Muhannada clan into self-imposed exile to Kuwait in 1964. Nasser returned to Qatar with his immediate family in 1977, the year in which his daughter Moza married Hamad bin Khalifa Al Thani when he was heir apparent of Qatar.

She received a BA in Sociology from Qatar University in 1986, and holds a MA in Public Policy in Islam from Hamad Bin Khalifa University. She was awarded an honorary Doctor of Humane Letters from Virginia Commonwealth University in 2003. She also holds an honorary doctorate from Texas A&M, Carnegie Mellon, Imperial College London, and the Georgetown University School of Foreign Service.

According to a Los Angeles Times investigation published in July 2020, Sheikha Moza's son Khalifa bin Hamad bin Khalifa Al Thani was accepted to USC as a transfer student from the community college Los Angeles Mission College after she met USC president C. L. Max Nikias in 2012 in Los Angeles, California, at the behest of USC trustee Thomas J. Barrack Jr.

Areas of work

Moza co-founded and chairs the Qatar Foundation for Education, Science and Community Development (QF), which was set up in 1995.

Moza also acted as chairperson of Silatech since 2008, chairperson of the Arab Democracy Foundation, and president of the Supreme Council for Family Affairs since 1998. She has been vice president of the Supreme Education Council since 2002 and was UNESCO's Special Envoy for Basic and Higher Education in 2003. In 2002, she and former Emir Hamad bin Khalifa Al Thani opened the Weill Cornell Medical College in Qatar. She is also a member of the Board of Overseers of Weill Cornell Medicine. Besides this, she is the chairperson of Sidra Medical and Research Center, a high-tech women's and children's hospital in Doha. She also endowed this medical center with $7.9 billion.

She works with the UN to support global education and has been selected as a United Nations Advocate for the Sustainable Development Goals.

In 2012, she founded the Education Above All (EAA) Foundation to improve access to quality education in developing countries. EAA is a partner of UNICEF and UNESCO.

She is the owner of Le Tanneur, a French leather-goods manufacturer. Additionally, in 2010, she was named as one of Forbes' 100 Most Powerful Women at #74. She was listed in the 'Top 100 most powerful Arabs' from 2013 to 2017 by Gulf Business.

As the public consort of the emir, she has represented Qatar at many international events, including state visits and royal weddings.

According to Vogue, she has customised haute couture designs to fit Qatari modesty rules. She has been involved with Fashion Trust Arabia (FTA), launched in September 2018, which focuses on womenswear designs.

As summarized by The New York Times in 2018, "Sheikha Moza is the object of lurid, often misogynistic insults in the Saudi, Emirati and Egyptian media, where she is portrayed as a power-hungry manipulator of weak men.

Titles, styles, and honours

Titles and styles
Moza may be styled as "Her Highness Sheikha Moza bint Nasser".

Honours

Foreign honours
 : Grand Cross of the Order of Queen Jelena
 : Grand Cross of the Order of Merit of the Italian Republic
 : 
 Honorary Grand Commander of the Order of the Defender of the Realm (SMN (K)) - Tun (2010)
 : Dame of the Order of Muhammad
 :
 Dame Grand Cross of the Order of the Netherlands Lion
 Recipient of the King Willem-Alexander Inauguration Medal
 : Grand Cross of the Order of Infante Henry
 : Dame Grand Cross of the Order of Isabella the Catholic
 : Honorary Dame Commander of the Order of the British Empire

Foreign awards
 : Member of the Decoration of the Smile
 
 Royal Institute of International Affairs: Chatham House Prize
 
 Recipient of the Andrew Carnegie Medal of Philanthropy
 Carnegie Mellon University: Honorary Degree of Doctor of Humane Letters
 George Bush Presidential Library: George Bush Award for Excellence in Public Service
 Virginia Commonwealth University: Honorary Degree of Doctor of Humane Letters

Children
The royal couple has five sons and two daughters:
Sheikh Jassim bin Hamad bin Khalifa Al Thani (born 1978) – heir apparent of Qatar until 2003.
Sheikh Tamim bin Hamad Al Thani, Prince of Qatar (born 1980) – heir apparent of Qatar (2003–2013), current Emir of Qatar.
Sheikha Al-Mayassa bint Hamad bin Khalifa Al Thani (born 1983).
Sheikha Hind bint Hamad bin Khalifa Al Thani (born 1984) – director of the Emir's Office since 2009.
Sheikh Joaan bin Hamad bin Khalifa Al Thani (born 1986).
Sheikh Mohammed bin Hamad bin Khalifa Al Thani (born 1988).
Sheikh Khalifa bin Hamad bin Khalifa Al Thani (born 1991).

References

External links

Official site of Moza bint Nasser
Backstory: Qatar reformed by a modern marriage
Lunch with the FT: Sheikha Moza

1959 births
Living people
People from Al Khor
House of Thani
Qatari Muslims
Qatari women in politics
Spouses of national leaders
Qatar University alumni
Recipients of the Order of Merit of the Italian Republic
Knights Grand Cross of the Order of Merit of the Italian Republic
Recipients of the Order of Prince Henry
Grand Crosses of the Order of Prince Henry
Recipients of the Order of Isabella the Catholic
Dames Grand Cross of the Order of Isabella the Catholic
Honorary Dames Commander of the Order of the British Empire
Honorary Grand Commanders of the Order of the Defender of the Realm